The 2017–18 Melbourne Stars Women's season was the third in the team's history. Coached by David Hemp and captained by Kristen Beams, the Stars finished WBBL03 in seventh place.

Squad
Each WBBL|03 squad featured 15 active players, with an allowance of up to five marquee signings including a maximum of three from overseas. Australian marquees were defined as players who made at least ten limited-overs appearances for the national team in the three years prior to the cut-off date (24 April 2017).

Personnel changes made ahead of the season included:
 Meg Lanning departed the Stars, signing with the Perth Scorchers. Kristen Beams was appointed captain of the team following Lanning's departure.
 English marquee Nat Sciver departed the Stars, also signing with the Perth Scorchers.
 New Zealand marquee Morna Nielsen and English marquee Danielle Hazell did not re-sign with the Stars.
 Erin Osborne signed with the Stars, departing the Sydney Thunder.
 Jess Duffin, Hayley Jensen and Emma Inglis departed the Stars, all signing with the Melbourne Renegades.
 Annabel Sutherland signed with the Stars, departing the Melbourne Renegades.

Changes made during the season included:
 Erin Osborne stood in as acting captain for two matches.
 New Zealand marquee Katey Martin signed with the Stars as a replacement player.

The table below lists the Stars players and their key stats (including runs scored, batting strike rate, wickets taken, economy rate, catches and stumpings) for the season.

Ladder

Fixtures

All times are local

{{Single-innings cricket match|date=26 December 2017|venue=WACA Ground, Perth|rain=|notes=Streamed on cricket.com.au
 Double header with Match 7 of the Men's BBL|result=Perth Scorchers won by 9 wickets (with 9 balls remaining)|report=Scorecard|umpires=Ashlee Kovalevs and John Taylor|motm=Nicole Bolton (Scorchers)|toss=Perth Scorchers won the toss and elected to field|wickets2=Erin Osborne 1/24 (4 overs)|time=11:20|runs2=Elyse Villani 84* (53)|score2=1/164 (18.3 overs)|team2=Perth Scorchers|wickets1=Emma King 2/24 (4 overs)|runs1=Lizelle Lee 76 (62)|score1=4/163 (20 overs)|team1=Melbourne Stars|round= Match 17|bg=#FFCCCC}}

The Adelaide Strikers recorded the first-ever one-wicket victory in WBBL history, defeating the Melbourne Stars on the last ball of the match. Requiring three runs with one delivery remaining, Tabatha Saville scored a boundary off Stars captain Kristen Beams to clinch a narrow win for the Strikers.

Statistics and awards
 Most runs: Lizelle Lee – 349 (10th in the league) Highest score in an innings: Lizelle Lee – 76 (62) vs Perth Scorchers, 26 December 2017
 Most wickets: Erin Osborne – 15 (equal 10th in the league) Best bowling figures in an innings:
 Annabel Sutherland – 4/20 (4 overs) vs Adelaide Strikers, 9 January 2018
 Erin Osborne – 4/20 (4 overs) vs Brisbane Heat, 13 January 2018
 Most catches (fielder): Erin Osborne – 8 (equal 8th in the league) Player of the Match awards: 
 Georgia Elwiss, Alana King, Katie Mack, Erin Osborne – 1 each
 Stars Player of the Season: Erin Osborne
WBBL|03 Young Gun Award: Annabel Sutherland (nominated)''

References

2017–18 Women's Big Bash League season by team
Melbourne Stars (WBBL)